Slush Puppie (stylized as SLUSH PUPPiE) is a slush beverage created in 1970, and marketed both directly by the Slush Puppie division of J&J Snack Foods, and through its Slush Puppie distributors in the United States.

A Slush Puppie has two major components; the base and the flavoring. The base is made from a special syrup that is mixed with water and then frozen. This creates a mixture resulting in pellets of ice in a sweet liquid. The taste is simply that of the flavored syrup. The brand's mascot is a white puppy named Chilly Dog wearing a blue shirt with the letter "S" and a knit hat.

Origin
The original owners, Will Radcliff (1939–2014), his sister, Phyllis, and their mother, Thelma, came up with the name "Slush Puppie" (based on hush puppy) while sitting on their front porch in Cincinnati, Ohio. The business started from a home address in Cincinnati and progressed to a single door small warehouse, to a manufacturing plant/warehouse, to a candy and tobacco distributor, to a front door repair shop, to finally a showplace building that overlooks the city of Cincinnati. 

Under Radcliff, Slush Puppie grew to $25 million in annual sales.  Radcliff sold Slush Puppie to Cadbury Schweppes for $16.6 million in 2000. Slush Puppie was then acquired by J & J Snack Foods (aka the ICEE Corporation), a food manufacturer based in New Jersey, on May 30, 2006.

See also
 Kakigori
 Snow cone

References

 "Drink Mogul Soaks Up Rural Life ; A Conservation Deal Lets Will Radcliff Of Slush Puppie Fame Stay On His Beloved Fly'n R Ranch." Orlando Sentinel, December 6, 2004 (pay wall).

External links
 Official U.S. site
 Official UK site
 Official Canadian site
 Official Australian site
 Official site The Netherlands
 Official Swiss site
 Official French site (France)

Non-alcoholic drinks
Frozen drinks
Products introduced in 1970